Winam Gulf is a significant extension of northeastern Lake Victoria into western Kenya. Formerly known as Kavirondo Gulf, Nyanza Gulf, and Lake Nyanza Gulf, it is a shallow inlet and is connected to the main lake by Rusinga Channel ( wide), which is partly masked from the main body of the lake by islands.

The port of Kisumu, Kenya's third-largest city, stands on its northeastern shore. Significant bays in the gulf include Naya Bay, Nyakach Bay, Osodo Bay, Kendu Bay, Homa Bay, Ruri Bay, Mirunda Bay, Asembo Bay, and Olambwe Bay. Islands in the gulf include Maboko, Rusinga, and Ndere Islands.

References

External links 
Topographic map sheet Kisumu

Lake Victoria
Bodies of water of Kenya
Gulfs of Africa